High Country is a 1983 Australian film about a cattleman turned racehorse owner.

References

External links
High Country at IMDb
High Country' at Peter Malone's website

Australian drama films
1980s English-language films
1983 films
1983 drama films
1980s Australian films